Järv may refer to:

 Wolverine in the Swedish language
 Harry Järv (1921–2009), Finland Swedish librarian, author and translator

See also 
 Järve (disambiguation)